Mpho Lerato Chabangu (born 15 August 1985) is a South African soccer player who plays as a right winger for Baberwa. He has previously played for the South Africa national football team.

International
He made his debut in a COSAFA Cup match against the Seychelles on 26 February 2005 and was part of Bafana Bafana's 2008 African Nations Cup squad and the 2012 Afcon.

International goals

References

External links

1985 births
Living people
People from Tembisa
Sportspeople from Gauteng
South African soccer players
South Africa international soccer players
2008 Africa Cup of Nations players
2013 Africa Cup of Nations players
Association football forwards
Association football midfielders
Mamelodi Sundowns F.C. players
SuperSport United F.C. players
University of Pretoria F.C. players
Moroka Swallows F.C. players
Pretoria Callies F.C. players
South Africa A' international soccer players
2014 African Nations Championship players